Gola is a village in the Gola CD block in the  Ramgarh subdivision of the Ramgarh district in the Indian state of Jharkhand.

Geography

Location

Area overview
Ramgarh has a vibrant coal-mining sector. The map alongside provides links to five operational areas of Central Coalfields spread across South Karanpura Coalfield, Ramgarh Coalfield and West Bokaro Coalfield. Four of the six CD blocks in the district have coal mines – Patratu, Ramgarh, Mandu and Chitarpur. The high concentration of census towns in these blocks are noticeable on the map. Only two blocks, Gola and Dulmi, are totally rural areas. Ramgarh district lies in the central part of the Chota Nagpur Plateau. The Damodar valley covers most of the district. The forested areas in highlands to the north and the south of the valley can be seen in the map (mark the shaded areas).”Chotanagpur has a charm of its own… The entire area forms one of the most charming series of views imaginable. The far-off hills in the background in exquisite tints of blue or purple as the light falls, the nearer hills picturesquely shaped and luxuriant in every shade of green with their bold escarpments in black or grey, and the brown plains below furnishing their quota of colours.”

Note: The map alongside presents some of the notable locations in the district. All places marked in the map are linked in the larger full screen map.

Civic administration

Police station
Gola police station serves the Gola CD block.

CD block HQ
The headquarters of Gola CD block are located at Gola.

Demographics
According to the 2011 Census of India, Gola had a total population of 8,076, of which 4,236 (52%) were males and 3,840 (48%) were females. Population in the age range 0–6 years was 1,070. The total number of literate persons in Gola was 5,559 (79.35% of the population over 6 years).

Transport
National Highway 320, running from Ramgarh Cantonment to Chas, passes through Gola.

Gola Road has a station on the Barkakana-Muri-Chandil line.

References

Villages in Ramgarh district